Paolo Saviane (20 March 1962 – 20 August 2021) was an Italian politician.

Biography
In 2015 he was unanimously elected provincial secretary of the Northern League of Belluno.

Election as Senator
In the 2018 Italian general election he was elected to the Senate of the Republic, on the Northern League list in the Veneto constituency .

He died on 20 August 2021 while hospitalised for heart surgery.

References

1962 births
2021 deaths
Lega Nord politicians
Senators of Legislature XVIII of Italy
People from the Province of Belluno
20th-century Italian people
21st-century Italian people